Ourika Valley is a valley in the Moroccan High Atlas along the Ourika River. It is located around 30 km from Marrakech, and is essentially populated by Berber people speaking Shilha. Despite its proximity to Marrakech, it is still considered a relatively well-preserved valley, by its very nature a and traditional mountain way of life.

History 
Ourika is the name of one of the most famous tribes, written by Ibn Khaldoun.

Monuments and touristic sites

Setti-Fatma  
Setti-Fatma is the last small town (or douar) which is accessible by the paved route. It is the departure point for many excursions to the nearby mountains. The most prized and most easy hike consists of mounting the length of a mountain torrent in order to discover the cascades.

Tnine-de-l’Ourika 
It is a little village (or douar) without great architectural interest. It is however the center of the weekly traditional market (or souk), taking place every Monday (or tnine in Arabic).

See also 
 Oukaimden

References 

Valleys of Morocco
Atlas Mountains